The National Assembly of Zimbabwe, previously the House of Assembly until 2013, is the lower house of the Parliament of Zimbabwe. It was established upon Zimbabwe's independence in 1980 as one of two chambers of parliament. Between the abolition of the Senate in 1989 and its reestablishment in 2005, the House of Assembly was the sole chamber of parliament.

Since the 2013 election, the National Assembly has had 270 members. Of these, 210 are elected in single-member constituencies. The last 60 seats are reserved for women, and are elected by proportional representation in 10 six-seat constituencies based on the country's provinces. On election day, each voter casts a single ballot, and this is used to assign seats to the parties for both types of seat.

Jacob Mudenda has been Speaker of the National Assembly since September 2013.

History
Under the 1980 Constitution, 20 of the 100 seats in the House of Assembly were reserved for the country's white minority, although whites and other ethnic minorities made up only 5% of the population at the time. These seats were abolished by constitutional amendment in 1987.

This size of 100 seats was used for two elections, the 1980 election held immediately before independence and the 1985 election. The 1990 election was the first election after the abolition of the white-reserved seats, and also expanded the House of Assembly to 120 seats, a size which was retained for the 1995 and 2000 elections.

With the 2005 election, the House of Assembly was expanded to 150 members. 120 members were directly elected in single member constituencies using the plurality (or first-past-the-post) system. The President appointed twelve additional members and eight provincial governors who held reserved seats in the House. The remaining ten seats were held by traditional chiefs who were chosen by their peers. All members served five-year terms.

Following the 2008 election, the House of Assembly was expanded to 210 seats and composed entirely of elected representatives. The appointed and ex officio members were transferred to the Senate. The Seventh House of Assembly was opened on August 26, 2008. The additional system of 60 seats reserved for women was established for the 2013 election.

See also
History of Zimbabwe
Legislative Branch
List of national legislatures
List of Zimbabwean parliamentary constituencies
Senate of Zimbabwe - the upper chamber of Parliament
List of speakers of the National Assembly of Zimbabwe

References

Government of Zimbabwe
Zimbabwe